The  is an aikido organization founded by Koichi Tohei in 1971, while he was the chief instructor at the Aikikai Hombu Dojo.  The official Japanese name of the organization is Shin Shin Toitsu Aikido Kai (心身統一合気道会), but it is also known in English-speaking countries as "Ki Society".  Its foundation reflected Tohei's differences with the Aikikai, and his own emphasis on developing the concept of Ki. Students of the art are graded in Ki and Aikido classes. Tohei's Ki lessons come from Shin Shin Tōitsu-dō (心身統一道), meaning "the way of realizing the [original] unity of mind and body". The martial discipline of the art is frequently referred to as Ki-Aikido, particularly in the Western world.

The Ki Society has its organizational headquarters in Chiyoda-ku in central Tokyo, and its head dojo at the Tenshinkan in Tochigi Prefecture, a large facility built on the Tohei family ancestral land.

Principles and Practice
At the Ki Society, Tohei envisioned a place where Ki could be taught to students of all ages, including the handicapped and infirm, and others who are incapable of Aikido martial art practice. Aikido is just one of the disciplines in Tohei's holistic art of Shin Shin Toitsudo; there are five disciplines learned by students at a Ki Society Dojo:

 Shin Shin Toitsu Aikido, the martial art
 Kiatsu (personal health and healing)
 Ki Breathing
 Ki Meditation
 Ki Development Exercises (methods for realizing oneness of mind and body are Oneness Rhythm Exercise, Sokushin no Gyo, and Senshin no Gyo)

Being one of the first to bring Aikido to the West from Japan in 1953, Tohei discovered numerous obstacles in teaching. Western students did not accept teachings at face value, and bombarded Tohei with questions, and even occasional "attacks" to test Tohei's real ability. Due to these teaching situations, Tohei was forced to create a clear system of teaching that combines Western methods to teach Eastern concepts such as ki, one-point, relaxing completely while maintaining the full flow of ki, etc. Through his lifetime in wars abroad and at home, and through his experiences with Aikido, in Sokushin no Gyo at the Ichikukai dojo, and the Japanese Yoga teachings of Tempu Nakamura, Tohei realized four universal principles that he felt should be used in all Ki Society practice, and in everyone's daily life.

 Keep One Point
 Relax Completely 
 Keep Weight Underside
 Extend Ki

Taigi Competition
Shin Shin Toitsu Aikido Kai hosts an All-Japan Taigi Competition every year at Ki no Kenkyukai (HQ), and every four years the World Taigi Competition is held there.  Various techniques are grouped into 31 sets of about 6 throws, each of which are called a 'Taigi', often based around a specific attack or another theme. Participant teams perform several taigi, selected each year. The competition measures the nage's form and movement with uke, rather than a competition between two opponents. It could be compared to paired figure skating competition. Judges award points for size, rhythm, calmness, balance, and the use of ki. The World Taigi Competition has not taken place since the death of Koichi Tohei.

Further reading
Koichi Tohei: Ki in Daily Life. Japan Publications, Tokyo, 1978, 
Koichi Tohei: Book of Ki: Co-ordinating Mind and Body in Daily Life. Japan Publications, Tokyo, 1976, 
Koretoshi Maruyama: Aikido with Ki. Japan Publications, Tokyo, 1984, 
Reed, William:  Ki:  A Practical Guide for Westerners.  Japan Publications, Tokyo, 1986, 
Reed, William:  A Road That Anyone Can Walk: Ki.  Japan Publications, Tokyo, 1992, 
Tohei, Koichi: Kiatsu. 2002, Japan Publications Trading Co; New edition, 
David E. Shaner: "Living With the Wind at Your Back: Seven Arts to Positively Transform Your Life." Connect, LLC, 2015
 Curtis, Christopher: "Letting Go" and "Ki Aikido - A Training Manual"

External links
 Official Ki Society Homepage
(Japanese) Wikipedia article, Shinshin Toitsu Aikido

Aikido organizations